Lorenz Milton Hart (May 2, 1895 – November 22, 1943) was an American lyricist and half of the Broadway songwriting team Rodgers and Hart. Some of his more famous lyrics include "Blue Moon", "The Lady Is a Tramp", "Manhattan", "Bewitched, Bothered and Bewildered", and "My Funny Valentine".

Life and career
Hart was born in Harlem, New York City, the elder of two sons, to Jewish immigrant parents, Max M. and Frieda (Isenberg) Hart, of German background. Through his mother, he was a great-grandnephew of the German poet Heinrich Heine. His father, a business promoter, sent Hart and his brother to private schools. (His brother, Teddy Hart, also went into theatre and became a musical comedy star. Teddy Hart's wife, Dorothy Hart, wrote a biography of Lorenz Hart.)

Hart received his early education from Columbia Grammar School and entered Columbia College in 1913, before switching to Columbia University School of Journalism, where he attended for two years. In 1919 a friend introduced him to Richard Rodgers, and the two joined forces to write songs for a series of amateur and student productions.

By 1918, Hart was working for the Shubert brothers, partners in theatre, translating German plays songs into English. In 1919, his and Rodgers' song "Any Old Place With You" was included in the Broadway musical comedy A Lonely Romeo. In 1920, six of their songs were used in the musical comedy Poor Little Ritz Girl, which also had music by Sigmund Romberg. They were hired to write the score for the 1925 Theatre Guild production The Garrick Gaieties, the success of which brought them acclaim.

Rodgers and Hart subsequently wrote the song and lyrics for 26 Broadway musicals during a partnership of more than 20 years that ended shortly before Hart's early death. Their "big four" were Babes in Arms, The Boys From Syracuse, Pal Joey, and On Your Toes. The Rodgers and Hart songs have been described as intimate and destined for long lives outside the theater. Many of their songs are standard repertoire for singers and jazz instrumentalists. Hart has been called "the expressive bard of the urban generation which matured during the interwar years".  But the "encomiums suggest[ing] that Larry Hart was a poet" caused his friend and fellow writer Henry Myers to state otherwise.  "Larry in particular was primarily a showman. If you can manage to examine his songs technically, and for the moment elude their spell, you will see that they are all meant to be acted, that they are part of a play. Larry was a playwright."

Rodgers and Hart wrote music and lyrics for several films, including Love Me Tonight (1932), The Phantom President (1932), Hallelujah, I'm a Bum (1933), and Mississippi (1935).  With their successes, during the Great Depression Hart was earning $60,000 annually, and he became a magnet for many people. He gave numerous large parties. Beginning in 1938, he traveled more often and suffered from his drinking. Nevertheless, Rodgers and Hart continued working together through mid-1942, with their final new musical being 1942's By Jupiter.

The New York Times reported on July 23, 1942: "The Theatre Guild announced yesterday that Richard Rodgers, Lorenz Hart and Oscar Hammerstein II will soon begin work on a musical version of Lynn Riggs's folk-play, Green Grow the Lilacs, which the Guild produced for sixty-four performances at the Guild Theatre in 1931." Rodgers had brought Hammerstein onto the project due to Hart's worsening mental state; Hart would admit he had difficulty writing a musical for such a rural setting as Oklahoma and departed, leaving an eager Hammerstein (whose own songwriting partner Jerome Kern had no interest in the project) to complete what would eventually become Oklahoma! Rodgers and Hammerstein would continue collaborating for 16 years (ending in Hammerstein's death in 1960), a partnership that made the duo one of the most successful composing teams of the 20th century.

Hart, meanwhile, was much affected by his mother's death in late April 1943.  Regrouping somewhat, Rodgers and Hart teamed a final time in the fall of 1943 for a revival of A Connecticut Yankee. Six new numbers, including "To Keep My Love Alive", were written for this reworked version of the play; it would prove to be Hart's last lyric.  Hart had taken off the night of the opening and was gone for two days. He was found ill in a hotel room and taken to Doctors Hospital, Upper East Side, but died within a few days.

Lyrical style
According to Thomas Hischak, Hart "had a remarkable talent for polysyllabic and internal rhymes", and his lyrics have often been praised for their wit and technical sophistication.

According to The New York Times music critic Stephen Holden, "Many of Hart's ballad lyrics conveyed a heart-stopping sadness that reflected his conviction that he was physically too unattractive to be lovable."  Holden also noted that "In his lyrics, as in his life, Hart stands as a compellingly lonely figure. Although he wrote dozens of songs that are playful, funny and filled with clever wordplay, it is the rueful vulnerability beneath their surface that lends them a singular poignancy."

Personal life and death
Hart lived with his widowed mother. He suffered from alcoholism, and would sometimes disappear and be gone for weeks at a time on alcoholic binges.

Holden writes:

Hart suffered from depression and sadness throughout his life. His erratic behavior was often the cause of friction between him and Rodgers and led to a breakup of their partnership in 1943 before his death. Rodgers then began collaborating with Oscar Hammerstein II.

Devastated by the death of his mother seven months earlier, Hart died in New York City of pneumonia from exposure on November 22, 1943, after drinking heavily. His remains are buried in Mount Zion Cemetery in Queens County, New York. The circumstances of his life were heavily edited and romanticized for the 1948 MGM biopic Words and Music.

Selected stage works
 1920 Poor Little Ritz Girl
 1925 The Garrick Gaieties
 1927 A Connecticut Yankee, based on the Mark Twain novel, A Connecticut Yankee in King Arthur's Court
 1928 Present Arms
 1935 Jumbo
 1936 On Your Toes
 1937 Babes in Arms
 1938 The Boys from Syracuse, based on William Shakespeare's The Comedy of Errors
 1938 I Married an Angel
 1939 Too Many Girls
 1940 Higher and Higher
 1940 Pal Joey, based on John O'Hara's novel Pal Joey
 1942 By Jupiter

Notable songs

 "A Ship Without a Sail"
 "Bewitched, Bothered and Bewildered"
 "Blue Moon"
 "Blue Room"
 "Dancing on the Ceiling"
 "Falling in Love with Love"
 "Glad to Be Unhappy"
 "Have You Met Miss Jones?"
 "He Was Too Good to Me"
 "I Could Write a Book"
 "I Didn't Know What Time It Was"
 "I Wish I Were in Love Again"
 "I'll Tell The Man In The Street"
 "I've Got Five Dollars"
 "Isn't It Romantic?"
 "It Never Entered My Mind"
 "It's Easy to Remember"
 "Johnny One Note"
 "Little Girl Blue"

 "Lover"
 "Manhattan"
 "Mountain Greenery"
 "My Funny Valentine"
 "My Heart Stood Still"
 "My Romance"
 "Sing for Your Supper"
 "Spring Is Here"
 "Ten Cents a Dance"
 "The Lady Is a Tramp"
 "The Most Beautiful Girl in the World"
 "There's a Small Hotel"
 "This Can't Be Love"
 "Thou Swell"
 "To Keep My Love Alive"
 "Where or When"
 "With a Song in My Heart"
 "You Took Advantage of Me"

References

Further reading
Friends of the USC Libraries. The Hart of the Matter: A Celebration of Lorenz Hart, September 30, 1973. [Los Angeles]: Friends of the USC Libraries, University of Southern California, 1973.
Hart, Dorothy. Thou Swell, Thou Witty: The Life and Lyrics of Lorenz Hart, New York: Harper & Row, 1976.
Marmorstein, Gary. A Ship Without A Sail: The Life of Lorenz Hart, New York: Simon & Schuster, 2012. 
Marx, Samuel; Clayton, Jan. Rodgers & Hart: Bewitched, Bothered, and Bedeviled: An Anecdotal Account, New York: Putnam, 1976.
Nolan, Frederick W. Lorenz Hart: A Poet on Broadway. New York: Oxford University Press, 1994.
Furia, Philip. The Poets of Tin Pan Alley: A History of America's Great Lyricists. New York: Oxford University Press, 1990.

External links

That Old Feeling:Heart to Hart- Time Magazine essay
Bio from Songwriters Hall of Fame
Databases for information about and lyrics by Lorenz Hart

 Lorenz Hart recordings at the Discography of American Historical Recordings.

1895 births
1943 deaths
20th-century American dramatists and playwrights
20th-century American musicians
20th-century American Jews
20th-century American LGBT people
Alcohol-related deaths in New York City
American gay writers
American gay musicians
American librettists
American musical theatre lyricists
American people of German-Jewish descent
Broadway composers and lyricists
Burials at Mount Zion Cemetery (New York City)
Columbia College (New York) alumni
Columbia Grammar & Preparatory School alumni
Columbia University Graduate School of Journalism alumni
Deaths from pneumonia in New York City
Jewish American songwriters
American LGBT dramatists and playwrights
American LGBT songwriters
Gay songwriters
Gay dramatists and playwrights
Gay Jews
People from Harlem
Songwriters from New York (state)